SMW+ was an open-source software bundle composed of the wiki application MediaWiki along with a number of its extensions, that was developed by the German software company Ontoprise GmbH from 2007 to 2012. In 2012, Ontoprise GmbH filed for bankruptcy and went out of business. DIQA-Projektmanagement GmbH, a start-up founded by former Ontoprise employees, now offers support for the software in SMW+, though under the name "DataWiki."

Details 

SMW+'s extensions include, most notably, Semantic MediaWiki and the Halo Extension. Cumulatively, SMW+ functions as a semantic wiki and is also meant to serve as an enterprise wiki for use within companies, for applications such as knowledge management and project management.

The SMW+ platform was available in a number of formats including a Windows installer, Linux installer, and VMware image.

SMW+ emerged from Project Halo, a research project meant to provide a platform for collaborative knowledge engineering for domain experts in biology, chemistry, and physics at the first stage.

References 

 Business applications with SMW+, a Semantic Enterprise Wiki. Michael Erdmann, Daniel Hansch.
 Practical applications of Semantic MediaWiki in commercial environments - Case Study: semantic-based project management. Daniel Hansch, Hans-Peter Schnurr. Presented at the ESTC 2009.
 User-Centered Design and Evaluation of Interface Enhancements to the Semantic MediaWiki. Frederik Pfisterer, Markus Nitsche, Anthony Jameson and Catalin Barbu. Presented at the CHI2008 (Computer Human Interaction Conference).
 Semantic Wikis: A Comprehensible Introduction with Examples from the Health Sciences. Maged N. Kamel Boulos. Journal of Emerging Technologies in Web Intelligence, Vol. 1, No. 1, August 2009
 Towards a Collaborative Semantic Wiki-based Approach to IT Service Management. Frank Kleiner, Andreas Abecker. Proceedings of I-SEMANTICS ’09.

External links
 Article at semanticweb.com about SMW+
 "Semantic Wikis: Fusing the two strands of the Semantic Web" - Talk given by Mark Greaves at the ISWC 2008

Semantic wiki software
Free software programmed in PHP
MediaWiki extensions